Tennis at the 2004 Summer Olympics in Athens took place on ten separate courts at the Olympic Tennis Centre. The surface was hardcourt.

172 players competed in four events. 2004 saw more of the top ranked players appearing, as this tournament saw world ranking points allocated to the players for the first time. Martina Navratilova made her first appearance at the Olympic Games where she partnered with Lisa Raymond in the ladies doubles.

Medal summary

Medal table

Events

External links
Official result book – Tennis

 
2004
2004 Olympics
2004 Summer Olympics events
Olympics
2004 in Greek tennis